Elaiochori (Greek: Ελαιοχώρι meaning "olive town") may refer to several villages in Greece:

Elaiochori, Achaea, part of the municipal unit of Dymi, Achaea
Elaiochori, Arcadia, part of the municipal unit of Korythio, Arcadia
Elaiochori, Kavala, part of the municipal unit of Eleftheres, Kavala regional unit
Elaiochori, Messenia, a village in the municipality of Kalamata, Messenia
Elaiochoria, part of the municipal unit of Triglia, Chalkidiki